Berezovka or Beryozovka may refer to:
Beryozovka, Russia (Berezovka), several inhabited localities in Russia
Byarozawka (Beryozovka), a town in Grodno Oblast, Belarus
Berezivka (Beryozovka), a town in Odessa Oblast, Ukraine
Berezovka (airport), an air base in Murmansk Oblast, Russia
Beryozovka (Perm Krai), a tributary of Lake Chusovskoye in Perm Krai, Russia
Beryozovka (Kolyma), a tributary of the Kolyma in Sakha Republic, Russia